VPg (viral protein genome-linked) is a protein that is covalently attached to the 5′ end of positive strand viral RNA and acts as a primer during RNA synthesis in a variety of virus families including Picornaviridae, Potyviridae and Caliciviridae. There are some studies showing that a possible VPg protein is also present in astroviridae, however, experimental evidence for this has not yet been provided and requires further study. The primer activity of VPg occurs when the protein becomes uridylated, providing a free hydroxyl that can be extended by the virally encoded RNA-dependent RNA polymerase. For some virus families, VPg also has a role in translation initiation by acting like a 5' mRNA cap.

VPg was first described in initial investigations of poliovirus RNA as a protein covalently attached to the 5' end of the genome. and later seen in caliciviruses.

Attachment during RNA synthesis
VPg must undergo post-translational uridylylation before it can act as a primer for replication. 3Dpol (the RdRp) is able to synthesize Vpg-pUpU-OH by using a polyA sequence within a stem-loop structure (cis-acting replication element) of 2C-ATPase as a template. Furthermore, a 5' terminal cloverleaf is required in cis to form the 3Dpol preinitiation RNA replication complex involved in uridylylating VPg.

3CDpro (a protease) cleaves VPg from membrane-bound 3AB.

Function as a 5' cap
Studies that used proteinase K to cleave VPg from the viral genome discovered that calicivirus vesicular exanthema virus lacking VPg is no longer infectious whereas poliovirus retains infectivity even with the absence of VPg. Because VPg sits at the 5' end of the genome, similar to eukaryotic 5' mRNA caps, several experiments were performed to explore its function in translation. Poliovirus utilizes an internal ribosome entry site (IRES) instead of a cap for translation initiation, abrogating the requirement of VPg in initial infection whereas studies with feline calicivirus confirmed that the VPg protein interacts directly with the cap-binding protein of the ribosome, eIF4E, and that this interaction is essential for viral translation.

Sources
Principles of Virology by S.J. Flint, L.W. Enquist, V.R. Racaniello, A.M. Skalka

Viral nonstructural proteins